The Limpopo girdled lizard (Cordylus jonesii), also known commonly as Jones's armadillo lizard and Jones's girdled lizard, is a species of lizard in the family Cordylidae. The species is endemic to Southern Africa.

Etymology
The specific name, jonesii, is in honor of a "Mr. C. R. Jones" who collected the holotype. The type locality is the Murchison Range in Limpopo.

Geographic range
C. jonesii is found along South Africa's border with Botswana, Zimbabwe, and Mozambique.

Behavior and habitat
The Limpopo girdled lizard is arboreal and inhabits dry forests, especially mopane woodland. It hides under loose bark and in hollow tree limbs.

Description
The dorsal pattern of C. jonesii varies from red to brown to gray, with dark spots or lines. On some individuals, the lines fuse into a black-bordered white stripe along the midline of the back. The Limpopo girdled lizard has a distinct dark dorsolateral stripe running from the head to the hips. The belly, throat, and lips are cream to yellow. The tail is very spiny and about 45% the total length of the animal.

Taxonomy
The Limpopo girdled lizard is sometimes classified as a subspecies of the tropical girdled lizard (Cordylus tropidosternum).  When both species are held together, the Limpopo girdled lizard has a noticeably shorter snout.  In C. jonesii the nostril pierces the center of the nasal scale (the lower posterior corner of the nasal in C. tropidosternum).  Scales on the throat and belly of C. jonesii are smooth instead of keeled. C. jonesii is exported from Mozambique for the pet trade, where it is often mislabeled as Cordylus vittifer.

References

Further reading
Boulenger GA (1891). "Description of a new Lizard of the Genus Zonurus from the Transvaal". Ann. Mag. Nat. Hist., Sixth Series 7: 417. (Zonurus jonesii, new species).
Branch, Bill (2004). Field Guide to Snakes and other Reptiles of Southern Africa. Third Revised edition, Second impression. Sanibel Island, Florida: Ralph Curtis Books Publishing. 399 pp. . (Cordylus tropidosternum jonesi, p. 195 + Plate 66).
Broadley DG, Branch WR (2002). "A review of the small east African Cordylus (Sauria: Cordylidae), with the description of a new species". African Journal of Herpetology 51 (1): 9–34.

Cordylus
Reptiles of South Africa
Reptiles described in 1891
Taxa named by George Albert Boulenger